Ira is a 2018 Indian Malayalam-language crime thriller film directed by Saiju S. S., written by Naveen John, and produced by Vysakh and Udaykrishna under the banner of Vysakh Udaykrishna Productions, and distributed by Udaykrishna. It stars Unni Mukundan and Gokul Suresh with Miya, Niranjana, Neeraja Das, Lena, Kailash and Shanker Ramakrishnan in supporting roles.

Principal photography began on 1 November 2017. The film was released in India on 16 March 2018. It was dubbed into Hindi as mera badla revenge 3

Plot
Aryan (Gokul Suresh) is a doctor whose love interest is Jennifer (Niranjana Anoop). He is arrested by Kerala Police for the murder of Minister Chandy(Alencier Ley Lopez), but claims he is innocent and wrongly accused. His life changes when Rajeev (Unni Mukundan), the central police officer investigating his case, comes into it. Rajeev investigates thoroughly to find that Aryan, who was new to the city, was appointed in a leading hospital as per recommendation from a priest who was close to its owner. Also, Aryan's love interest Jenny is the granddaughter of the deceased minister. Her father Jacob Chandy and her mother Daisy had been separated. Rajeev makes a detailed account of all events on the day of minister Chandy's death. The cause of death was allegedly a deadly chemical which was found in his body. Rajeev meets Aryan in jail and assures him that he would be set free if he is innocent.

Later, Rajeev meets Jenny and narrates a different story, which starts off with Rajeev and his assistant being handed over the investigation of a case regarding tribal families in a forest village. He meets a girl Karthika (Miya), and, after a set of funny events, falls in love with her. However, he understands that Karthika is none other than the famous journalist Vaigha Devi, who deals with social crimes against tribal people. A factory which produced illegal medicines had been testing these on the village people with the help of Bhadran, a rowdy. Rajeev understands more of these issues before his investigation ends. Later, Karthika wishes to open up to Rajeev on her love. However, at the meeting place, she is welcomed by Minister Chandy and his son Jacob. It is revealed that Chandy is the one behind illegal medicine production for the village. Karthika has personal vengeance towards Chandy as he murdered her parents. She is stabbed by Jacob and left to die. But she was brutally raped by bhadran. Rajeev, who arrives later, finds her murdered, and attempts to take her to the hospital but gets hit by Bhadran and becomes unconscious. Rajeev, who ends his flashback, tells to a shattered Jenny that her father might have accused the innocent Aryan so that he can create an emotional note about minister Chandy's death. Jenny goes back to her mother, Daisy, who is a brilliant criminal lawyer and apologizes for hating her. In the court session, Adv. Daisy brilliantly proves that Aryan is innocent and bails him out, also proving that Jacob has purposefully accused Aryan with the help of a corrupt Police inspector Satish. Later, Jacob's car suffers anonymous gunshots, which arouses curiosities. Rajeev is called to Jacob's guest house situated at an island, wherein Jacob tells him that he had kidnapped Aryan also. He had planned to kill both of them so as to create a new story and deceive the public. Rajeev laughs at him and reveals certain things unknown to Jacob. In a major twist, it turns out that minister Chandy was actually murdered by Aryan with the help of none other than Rajeev. Rajeev reveals that on the day of the murder, he, in the disguise of a male nurse, had replaced the injection drug meant for minister Chandy with a life-threatening one so that the minister would be injected by it. After revealing these facts to a terror stricken Jacob, Rajeev also tells him that the murder was done to avenge the murder of Karthika, who was Rajeev's love interest and also Aryan's elder sister. After revealing all the truths, Rajeev shoots and kills Jacob. Aryan escapes, and Rajeev meets the media folk and tells them about the minister's murder. Jacob's murder case is handed over to Rajeev (who claims he is the only one to spot the so-called murderer). The film ends with Rajeev and Aryan all set to kill Bhadran, who murdered Karthika.

Cast

Soundtrack
The film's original songs were composed by Gopi Sundar:

Production
The film is the first production of director Vysakh and writer Udaykrishna under their production house Vysakh Udaykrishna Productions. It was directed by Saiju S. S., who dubbed for Mukundan's voice in his debut film Bombay March 12. Saiju was a former associate director to Vysakh.

Principal photography began on 1 November 2017. Sudheer Surendran was in charge of the cinematography.

Release
The film was released on 16 March 2018 in India.

References

External links
 

2018 films
Films shot in Kollam
2010s Malayalam-language films
Indian crime thriller films
Indian action thriller films
Indian crime action films
2018 action thriller films
2018 crime action films
2018 crime thriller films